The Riding Avenger is a 1936 American Western film directed by Harry L. Fraser and starring Hoot Gibson, Ruth Mix and June Gale. Originally made by Diversion Pictures, it was picked up for distribution by Grand National Pictures.

Cast
 Hoot Gibson as Buck Bonne - aka The Morning Glory Kid 
 Ruth Mix as Chita Ringer 
 Buzz Barton as Tony 
 June Gale as Jessie McCoy 
 Stanley Blystone as Mort Ringer 
 Ed Cassidy as Marshal Tom 
 Roger Williams as Jud Castro - Henchman 
 Francis Walker as Welch - McCoy's Foreman 
 Slim Whitaker as Slim - Jailbird 
 Budd Buster as Bud - Jailbird

References

Bibliography
 James Robert Parish & Michael R. Pitts. Film directors: a guide to their American films. Scarecrow Press, 1974.

External links
 

1936 films
1936 Western (genre) films
1930s English-language films
American Western (genre) films
Films directed by Harry L. Fraser
Grand National Films films
American black-and-white films
1930s American films